Richard Paul Max Fleischer (4 July 1861, Lipine in Oberschlesien, Kingdom of Prussia – 3 April 1930, Menton, France) was a German painter and bryologist. As a botanist, he is remembered for his work with Javan mosses.

Biography 
He took art classes in Breslau, qualifying as an art teacher in 1881. He furthered his studies in Munich and Paris, where his interest in natural sciences grew. He subsequently moved to Zurich in 1892 in order to study geology. In the latter part of the 1890s, he was invited by botanist Melchior Treub to Java as an illustrator. On Java, along with his artistic duties, he collected regional botanical specimens and conducted investigations of the island's mosses. During his time spent in the Dutch East Indies, he also learned the technique of creating batik prints from vegetable dyes.

After several years on Java, he traveled to New Guinea, the Bismarck Archipelago, Australia, New Zealand and South America, prior to returning to Germany in 1903. From 1908 to 1913, he revisited Maritime Southeast Asia, where he collected mostly bryophytes but also orchids and fungi on Java.

In 1914 he began work at the botanical museum in Berlin and three years later, he was appointed a professor of botany at the University of Berlin. In 1925 he traveled to the Canary Islands in order to paint and to study the regions' mosses. During the following year, he relocated to The Hague, and in 1927 he returned to the Canaries with his second wife, P.G. Haigton. After his death in 1930, his private collections and library were purchased by an antiquarian in Leipzig.

Gallery

Publications 
 "Die Musci der Flora von Buitenzorg : zugleich Laubmoosflora von Java / bearbeitet von Max Fleischer ; Enthaltend alle aus Java bekannt gewordenden Sphagnales und Bryales, nebst kritischen Bemerkungen vieler Archipelarten, sowie, indischer und australischer Arten";   Series: Flore de Buitenzorg ; pt. 5. Leiden : E.J. Brill, (1900-1922). In the fourth volume of this work, he delineated a new natural system of classifying mosses that was subsequently adopted by Viktor Ferdinand Brotherus in his second edition of Musci in Adolf Engler's Die Natürlichen Pflanzenfamilien.

See also
 List of German painters

References 

1861 births
1930 deaths
Academic staff of the Humboldt University of Berlin
19th-century German painters
19th-century German male artists
German male painters
20th-century German botanists
Bryologists
20th-century German painters
20th-century German male artists